Henriette Voigt (24 November 1808 - 15 October 1839) was a German pianist.
Born Henriette Kunze in Leipzig, Voigt was a pupil of Ludwig Berger. She was the wife of merchant Karl Voigt, at whose house many of the most important musicians of the day gathered. She was the dedicatee of the second piano sonata of Robert Schumann. As a pianist she would sometimes play four-handed piano with Felix Mendelssohn. With Karl she was the mother of two daughters, whose godfathers were Mendelssohn and Schumann. Voigt died in the city of her birth.

References

1808 births
1839 deaths
German classical pianists
Women classical pianists
German women pianists
19th-century German musicians
19th-century German women musicians
19th-century classical pianists
Musicians from Leipzig
19th-century women pianists